High Brooms railway station is on the Hastings line in the south of England and serves High Brooms and Southborough in the borough of Tunbridge Wells, Kent. It is  down the line from London Charing Cross. The station and all trains serving it are operated by Southeastern.

History 
High Brooms was originally opened in 1893 as Southborough by the South Eastern Railway; it acquired its present name in 1925. It is situated on a five-mile gradient from Tonbridge to the north of the station.  The main station buildings are on the northbound platform. There is a closed waiting room on the southbound platform.  Access to the southbound platform is via stairs from a side entrance, and access to the northbound platform is at street level. A subway links the two platforms.

Services 
All services at High Brooms are operated by Southeastern using ,  and  EMUs.

The typical off-peak service in trains per hour is:
 2 tph to London Charing Cross via 

During the peak hours, the station is served by additional services between London Charing Cross and Tunbridge Wells.

References

External links

Railway stations in Royal Tunbridge Wells
DfT Category D stations
Former South Eastern Railway (UK) stations
Railway stations in Great Britain opened in 1893
Railway stations served by Southeastern